Ouled Boudjemaa is a municipality in north-western Algeria.

References 

Communes of Aïn Témouchent Province
Cities in Algeria
Algeria